The Franklin Hardeman House is a property in Franklin, Tennessee that was listed on the National Register of Historic Places in 1988.  The property is also known as Sugar Hill and is denoted as Williamson County historic resource WM-291.

It was built or has other significance as of c.1835. It includes Greek Revival architecture.

The property was covered in a 1988 study of Williamson County historical resources.

References

Houses on the National Register of Historic Places in Tennessee
Houses in Franklin, Tennessee
Greek Revival houses in Tennessee
Houses completed in 1835
National Register of Historic Places in Williamson County, Tennessee